Umesh Shukla is an Indian director who works in Bollywood films. He is best known for his work in the critically acclaimed comedy drama film Oh My God. He made his directorial debut with UTV Motion Pictures' and Bindass' presentation Dhoondte Reh Jaaoge. Shukla's's latest release is 102 Not Out featuring  Amitabh Bachchan and Rishi Kapoor.

As an actor, he is known for his villain role in Mithun Chakraborty' s Yaar Gaddar where he played the governor and his alter ego Sheila (the governor's wialso acted directed in many Gujarati plays. He is also well known as a director for Gujarati Play (natak), Kanjee Viruddha Kanjee.

Filmography and TV work

References

External links
 

Living people
Hindi-language film directors
Indian male screenwriters
Male actors in Hindi cinema
Male actors in Hindi television
21st-century Indian film directors
20th-century Indian male actors
21st-century Indian male actors
Best Adapted Screenplay National Film Award winners
Year of birth missing (living people)